Pseudarthrobacter enclensis is a Gram-positive and non-motile bacterium species from the genus Pseudarthrobacter which has been isolated from marine sediments from Chorão Island, Goa, India.

References

External links
Type strain of Arthrobacter enclensis at BacDive -  the Bacterial Diversity Metadatabase

Bacteria described in 2015
Micrococcaceae